In Lovecraft's Shadow: The Cthulhu Mythos Stories of August Derleth is a collection of fantasy and horror short stories by American writer  August Derleth. It was released in 1998 by Mycroft & Moran in an edition of 2,051 copies.

The stories are part of the Cthulhu Mythos and several had appeared previously in the Arkham House collections:  The Mask of Cthulhu (1958), The Trail of Cthulhu (1962) and Colonel Markesan and Less Pleasant People (with Mark Schorer, 1966).

Contents

In Lovecraft's Shadow contains the following tales:

 "Introduction", by Joseph Wrzos
 "A Few Words About the Artist", by Joseph Wrzos
 Part I: Homage, Thricefold
 "Providence: Two Gentlemen Meet at Midnight"
 Part II: North Woods Stories: Ithaqua of the Snows & Others
 "The Thing That Walked on the Wind"
 "Ithaqua"
 "Beyond the Threshold"
 "The Dweller in Darkness"
 Part III: Collaborations: Non-Lovecraftian
 "Lair of the Star-Spawn" (with Mark Schorer)
 "Spawn of the Maelstrom" (with Mark Schorer)
 "The Horror from the Depths" (with Mark Schorer)
 "The House in the Oaks" (with Robert E. Howard)
 Part IV: The Old Ones Abroad
 "Those Who Seek"
 "The God-Box"
 "Something from Out There"
 Part V: The Mythos in Verse
 "Incubus"
 Part VI: Miskatonic Valley Tales: Arkham & Environs
 "The Return of Hastur"
 "The Passing of Eric Holm"
 "The Sandwin Compact"
 "Something in Wood"
 "The Whippoorwills in the Hills"
 "The House in the Valley"
 "The Seal of R’lyeh"
 Part VII: On Cthulhu's Trail: The Laban Shrewsbury Stories
 "The House on Curwen Street: The Manuscript of Andred Phelan" 
 "The Watcher from the Sky: The Deposition of Abel Keane"
 "The Gorge Beyond Salapunco: "The Testament of Claiborne Boyd"
 "The Keeper of the Key: The Statement of Nayland Colum"
 "The Black Island: The Narrative of Horvath Blayne"
 Part VIII: Coda, Epistolary
 "On Reading Old Letters. For H.P.L."
 Part IX: The Mythos in Miniature:
 "A Note on the Cthulhu Mythos"
 Notes
 Appendix: The Derleth Cthulhu Mythos Stories (Excluding the Lovecraft Collaborations) in Order of Publication

Sources

1998 short story collections
Fantasy short story collections
Horror short story collections